Friedrich Adolf Philippi (October 15, 1809 in Berlin – August 29, 1882 in Rostock) was a Lutheran theologian of Jewish origin.

He was the son of a wealthy Jewish banker, a friend of the Mendelssohn family.

Converted to Christianity in 1829, he studied philosophy and theology at Berlin and Leipzig (PhD 1831), and became successively a teacher at a private school in Dresden and at the Joachimsthalsche Gymnasium at Berlin (1833).

In 1837 he received his diploma as Lutheran minister, and in 1838 was admitted as privatdozent to the theological faculty of the Humboldt University of Berlin.

In 1841 he was elected professor of theology at the University of Dorpat; he received the degree of D.D. "honoris causa" from the Friedrich-Alexander-University, Erlangen-Nuremberg in 1843.

Bibliography 

 Die Lehre vom Thätigen Gehorsam Christi, Berlin, 1841
 Kirchliche Glaubenslehre, Berlin, 1859 (Volumes 3-4)
 Kirchliche Glaubenslehre, Berlin, 1879 (Volumes 6)
 Commentar über den Brief Pauli an die Römer, Frankfurt, 1856
 De Celsi, Adversarii Christianorum, Philosophandi Genere, Berlin, 1868
 Vorlesungen über Symbolik, Gütersloh, 1883

External links 
 Biography at Jewish Encyclopedia
 Biography at HaGefen Publishing
 Contemporary Obituary: Friedrich Adolf Philippi—A Jewish Witness to the Gospel

References 

Converts to Lutheranism from Judaism
1809 births
1882 deaths
19th-century German Jews
German Lutherans
19th-century Lutherans
Writers from Berlin